Funral is a 2022 Indian Marathi language film directed by Vivek Dubey. Written and produced by Ramesh Maruti Dighe under the banner of Before After Entertainment, Funral won the "Best Film on Social Issues" award at the 68th National Film Awards.

Cast 

 Aroh Welankar
 Vijay Kenkare
 Prematai Sakhardande
 Sambhaji Bhagat
 Uday Nirgutkar
 Harshad Shinde
 Siddhesh Pujare 
 Parth Gatge
 Tanvi Barve
 Ajit Kelkar 
 Upendra Date

Production 

Dighe started writing the script in 2014 selections from his own life experiences, dedicated to friend Hira. Film Director Dubey said that the project started in 2019 and most of the shooting was completed before the lockdown came into force, but it hampered his dubbing and sound score work.

Critical Reception 
The Mihir Bhanage of The Times of India  wrote "Funral is heartfelt story that cultminates in a very nicely written climax. Though it falls short in the technical aspects, the emotion it conveys is universal and for that, it deserves a watch". Keyur Seta of Cinestaan given 2 out of 5 stars and said "Funral gives the feel and atmosphere of a chawl life and screenplay is looks like serious yet light-hearted way. The film conveys a philosophical message around death in a simple manner. But for some strange reason, while Funral has its heart in the right place, the film feels like an incomplete journey".

References

External links 

2020s Marathi-language films